A list of films produced in Iran ordered by year of release. For an alphabetical list of Iranian films see :Category:Iranian films.

 List of Iranian films before 1960
 List of Iranian films of the 1960s
 List of Iranian films of the 1970s
 List of Iranian films of the 1980s
 List of Iranian films of the 1990s
 List of Iranian films of the 2000s
 List of Iranian films of the 2010s
 List of Iranian films of the 2020s

External links
 Iranian film at the Internet Movie Database